The 1976 Czechoslovak motorcycle Grand Prix was the tenth round of the 1976 Grand Prix motorcycle racing season. It took place on 22 August 1976 at the Brno circuit.

500cc classification

350 cc classification

250 cc classification

Sidecar classification

References

Czech Republic motorcycle Grand Prix
Czechoslovak
Motorcycle Grand Prix